Sir Robert Worsley (by 1512 – 1585), of Booths, Lancashire, was an English politician.

He was a Member (MP) of the Parliament of England for Lancashire in March 1553 and 1559.

References

1585 deaths
Members of the Parliament of England (pre-1707) for Lancashire
Year of birth uncertain
English MPs 1553 (Edward VI)
English MPs 1559